Elymus villosus is a species of wild rye known by the common names silky wild rye, downy wild rye, or hairy wild rye. It is native to eastern North America.

References 

villosus
Bunchgrasses of North America
Grasses of the United States
Grasses of Canada
Native grasses of the Great Plains region
Flora of the United States
Flora of the Canadian Prairies
Flora of the Eastern United States
Flora of the Appalachian Mountains
Flora of the Great Lakes region (North America)
Plants described in 1809
Taxa named by Gotthilf Heinrich Ernst Muhlenberg